Elizabeth Chambers may refer to:

Elizabeth Chambers (actress), British actress 
Elizabeth Chambers (pilot), American pilot
Elizabeth Chambers (television personality) (born 1982), American model, television host, news reporter and actress